The Zhuya is a river in Irkutsk Oblast, East Siberia, Russian Federation. It is the second largest tributary of the Chara river in terms of length and area of its basin. The area is largely uninhabited, Svetly —a small goldmining place— and Perevoz villages are located by the river bank.

History
The area of the Zhuya river was formerly renowned as part of the "Vitim Goldfields". The mines on the banks of the river were discovered and developed in the 19th century by Irkutsk gold miner K.P. Trapeznikov. There are still gold mining ventures in the Zhuya basin, especially in the area of its tributary, the Vacha.

Course
The Zhuya is a left tributary of the Chara, of the Lena basin. Its source is in the northern slope of the Kropotkin Range. 
In its upper course the Zhuya flows roughly northwards and then northeastwards across the Patom Highlands, flowing across lake Tolendo. It turns in an eastward direction, meandering across a plain before joining the Chara near Ust-Zhuya, also known as Chara, an abolished settlement. 

The river is navigable below its confluence with the Khomolkho.
The Zhuya is frozen between October and May.

See also
List of rivers of Russia
Bodaibo District

References

External links
Река Вача протекает по территории Иркутской области, география истока, притоков и устья Vacha river
С начала лета в Приангарье утонули пятеро детей (in Russian)

Rivers of Irkutsk Oblast